Unexpected Dreams – Songs from the Stars is a 2006 compilation album featuring various actors singing lullabies and other songs.

Album information
The album features fourteen various lullabies and songs about dreams, all sung by celebrities not usually known for their singing talent. The album's title has two meanings; first, the songs are all about dreams, and second, it is also the celebrities's "unexpected dreams" to be recording artists.

The music is performed by members of the Los Angeles Philharmonic Orchestra.

Track listing
"Summertime" – Scarlett Johansson
"The Sweetest Gift"– Ewan McGregor
"In My Daughter's Eyes" – Taraji P. Henson 
"My Heart Is So Full of You" – Jennifer Garner   
"Make You Feel My Love" – Jeremy Irons  
"Lullabye (Goodnight, My Angel)" – John Stamos   
"Little Child" – Lucy Lawless    
"The Wish Song" – Marissa Jaret Winokur  
"The Greatest Discovery" – Eric McCormack 
"No One Is Alone" – Victor Garber 
"Nightshift" – Julia Louis-Dreyfus 
"Golden Slumbers" – Nia Vardalos
"Lullabye in Ragtime" – John C. Reilly 
"Good Night" – Teri Hatcher

2006 compilation albums
Children's music albums
Rhino Records compilation albums